Places I've Done Time is a studio album by American country music singer and songwriter Tom T. Hall issued by RCA Records in 1978. It reached #19 in the US Country Charts and #17 in the Canadian Country Charts. Two singles from the album, "What Have You Got to Lose" and "Son of Clayton Delaney" also charted in both countries.

Track listing
All tracks composed by Tom T. Hall; except where indicated
Side 1
"What Have You Got to Lose" 
"I Couldn't Live in Southern California" 
"The Grocery Truck" 
"The Man Who Shot Himself"
"Son of Clayton Delaney"

Side 2
"Mr. Bojangles" (Jerry Jeff Walker)
"The Three Sofa Story" 
"The Great East Broadway Onion Championship of 1978"
"Hat Full of Feathers" (Glen Ray)
"Gimme Peace" (Hillman Hall)

Musicians
Harold Bradley, James Marshall - bass guitar
Henry Strzelecki, Floyd Chance - bass
Harold Bradley - banjo
Hayward Bishop - drums
Bobby Wood - piano
Bill Wence - electric piano
Ray Edenton, Jerry Shook, Gary Lusk, Charles Stewart, Chip Young - rhythm guitar
Rick Money - acoustic guitar
Murrel Counts - fiddle
Dale Sellers - electric guitar, acoustic dobro
James Edwards - slide dobro, mandolin
Sheldon Kurland, Virginia Christensen, Carl Goradetzky, Wilfred Lehman, Stephen Smith, Samuel Terranova, Pamela Vonasdale, Stephanie Woolf - violin
Marvin Chantry, Gary Vanosdale - viola
Byron Bach, Roy Christensen - cello
Cam Mullins - string arrangements
Lea Jane Berinati, Yvonne Hodges, Sherilyn Kramer - backing vocals

Production
Producers: Ken Nelson & Fuzzy Owen
Recording Engineer: Al Pachuki
Assistant Engineer: Stan Beavers
Mastering Engineer: Randy Kling
Recorded at the Toy Box, Brentwood, Tennessee
Front album cover photo: Hope Powell
Back album cover montage: Joe Horton
Album art direction: Mary Lancaster, Pinwheel Studios

References 

1978 albums
Tom T. Hall albums
RCA Records albums